Coleophora opulens is a moth of the family Coleophoridae. It is found in Mongolia.

References

opulens
Moths described in 1977
Moths of Asia